Tyler James Freitas (born July 2, 2000) is an American professional soccer player who plays as a defender.

Career

Youth
Freitas played club soccer with Bayside FC, before joining the New England Revolution academy in 2014. In 2019, Freitas earned the 2019 UnitedHealthcare Revolution Academy Player of the Year Award. In 2019, he joined the club's first team squad on a pre-season tour of Spain.

Colmenar Viejo
In 2019, after graduating high school, Freitas had committed to playing college soccer at the University of Vermont. However, he instead opted to pursue a professional career and signed with sixth-tier Spanish side Colmenar Viejo. He made 14 appearances for the club during their 2019–2020 season.

New England Revolution II
In April 2021, Freitas returned to the United States to train with his former academy side New England Revolution. He signed a deal with the club's USL League One side New England Revolution II on April 16, 2021. He made his debut for the club on June 26, 2021, appearing as a 74th-minute substitute during a 3–0 win over North Texas SC. Freitas was not announced as a returning player for the club's 2022 season where they'd be competing in the newly formed MLS Next Pro.

Personal
Tyler's brother, Justin, also played soccer with New England Revolution and Colmenar Viejo. Freitas holds a Portuguese passport and speaks fluent Portuguese.

References

External links 
 

Living people
2000 births
American expatriate soccer players
American expatriate sportspeople in Spain
American people of Portuguese descent
American soccer players
Association football defenders
Expatriate footballers in Spain
New England Revolution II players
People from North Attleborough, Massachusetts
Soccer players from Massachusetts
United States men's youth international soccer players
USL League One players